Birutė Marija Filomena Galdikas or Birutė Mary Galdikas, OC (born 10 May 1946), is a Lithuanian-Canadian anthropologist, primatologist, conservationist, ethologist, and author. She is a professor at Simon Fraser University. In the field of primatology, Galdikas is recognized as a leading authority on orangutans. Prior to her field study of orangutans, scientists knew little about the species.

Early life
Galdikas was born on 10 May 1946 in Wiesbaden, Germany. Her parents, Antanas and Filomena Galdikas, were Lithuanian refugees fleeing the Soviet occupation of the Baltic states following World War II. When Galdikas was two years old, the family moved to Canada in 1948, when her father signed a contract to work in copper mining in Quebec. The following year, they relocated to Toronto, where Galdikas grew up. Her father worked as a miner and a contractor. As a young child, Birutė's head was filled with visions of far-off forests and exotic creatures. The first book she borrowed from the Toronto Public Library was a tale about a monkey named Curious George. When she grew older, she was inspired by the National Geographic adventures of Jane Goodall and Dian Fossey. She has two younger brothers and a younger sister.

Education 
In 1962 the Galdikas family moved to Vancouver, where Galdikas met her future husband, Rod Brindamour. Two years later, after Galdikas had begun studies at the University of British Columbia (UBC), the family moved to the United States, where Galdikas enrolled in the University of California, Los Angeles (UCLA), and studied psychology and zoology. In 1966, she earned her bachelor's degrees in psychology and zoology, jointly awarded by UCLA and UBC. She married Brindamour and earned her master's degree in anthropology from UCLA both in 1969.

During her graduate studies at UCLA, Galdikas met paleoanthropologist Louis Leakey, and proposed a plan aimed at studying orangutans in their natural habitats. Galdikas convinced Leakey to help orchestrate her endeavor, despite his initial reservations. Leakey found funding from the National Geographic Society which agreed to establish a research facility in Borneo. Her research became the basis of her doctoral studies, and she earned her doctorate in anthropology from UCLA in 1978.

Work

Research in Borneo 
In 1971, at age 25, Galdikas and her then-husband, photographer Rod Brindamour, arrived in Tanjung Puting Reserve, in Indonesian Borneo. Galdikas was the third of a trio of women appointed by Leakey to study great apes in their natural habitat. Dubbed by Leakey "The Trimates" the trio also included Jane Goodall, who studied chimpanzees, and Dian Fossey, who studied gorillas. Leakey and the National Geographic Society helped Galdikas set up her research camp near the edge of the Java Sea, dubbed "Camp Leakey", to conduct field study on orangutans in Borneo. Before Galdikas's studies, the orangutan was the least understood of the great apes. Galdikas went on to greatly expand scientific knowledge of orangutan behavior, habitat and diet.

Orangutan Foundation International 

In 1986 Galdikas and her colleagues founded Orangutan Foundation International (OFI), based in Los Angeles, USA, to help support orangutans around the world. Her second husband, Pak Bohap, who was a Dayak rice farmer and tribal president, assisted in setting up sister organisations in Australia, Indonesia, and the United Kingdom and is co-director of the orangutan program in Borneo.

Advocacy and rehabilitation work 
Galdikas has remained in Borneo for over 40 years while becoming an outspoken advocate for orangutans and the preservation of their rainforest habitat, which is rapidly being destroyed by loggers, palm oil plantations, gold miners, and unnatural conflagrations. While campaigning actively on behalf of primate conservation and preservation of rainforest, Galdikas continues her field research, among the lengthiest continuous studies of a mammal ever conducted.

Galdikas's conservation efforts extend beyond advocacy, largely focusing on rehabilitation of the orphaned orangutans turned over to her for care. Many of these orphans were once illegal pets, before becoming too smart and difficult for their owners to handle.

She has written several books, including a memoir entitled Reflections of Eden. In it, Galdikas describes her experiences at Camp Leakey and efforts to rehabilitate ex-captive orangutans and release them into the Borneo rainforest.

Galdikas is currently a professor at Simon Fraser University in Burnaby, British Columbia, and Professor Extraordinaire at Universitas Nasional in Jakarta, Indonesia. She is also president of the Orangutan Foundation International in Los Angeles, California.

In 2021 Dr. Birute Galdikas became a patron of the nature conservation non-profit organisation The Ancient Woods Foundation (Sengirės fondas) aiming to protect the remaining old-growth forests in Lithuania with all the biodiversity there.

Recognition 
Galdikas has been featured in Life, The New York Times, The Washington Post, the Los Angeles Times, numerous television documentaries, and twice on the cover of National Geographic. Galdikas's work has been acknowledged in television shows hosted by Steve Irwin as well as Jeff Corwin on Animal Planet.

In 1995, Galdikas was made an Officer of the Order of Canada.

Along with fellow Trimate Jane Goodall and preeminent field biologist George Schaller, Galdikas received the Tyler Prize for Environmental Achievement in 1997 for her groundbreaking field research and lifetime contributions to the advancement of environmental science. Other honors include the Indonesia's Hero for the Earth Award (Kalpataru), Institute of Human Origins Science Award Officer, United Nations Global 500 Award (1993), Elizabeth II Commemorative Medal, the Eddie Bauer Hero of the Earth (1991), PETA Humanitarian Award (1990), and the Sierra Club Chico Mendes Award (1992). She was awarded a key to the city of Las Vegas, Nevada, in 2009 when she gave a presentation for the anthropology department at U.N.L.V.

Media

Books 
 Reflections of Eden: My Years with the Orangutans of Borneo (1995)
 Orangutan Odyssey (1999)
 Great Ape Odyssey. (2005). Abrams: New York.

Film and television 
Galdikas stars in the feature documentary Born to Be Wild 3D, released in April 2011. She has also appeared in the documentaries Nature (TV series documentary, 2005), Life and Times (TV series documentary, 1996), 30 Years of National Geographic Specials (TV documentary, 1995), Orangutans: Grasping the Last Branch (documentary, 1989), Beauty and the beasts (Channel 4 UK documentary, 1996), The Last Trimate (TV documentary, 2008), and She Walks With Apes (CBC TV documentary, 2019). Terry Pratchett's Jungle Quest (documentary, C4, UK 1995)

Controversy 
Galdikas was criticised in the late 1990s regarding her methods of rehabilitation. Primatologists debated the issue on the Internet mailing list Primate-Talk; the issue was further fueled by the publication of articles in Outside magazine (May 1998) and Newsweek (June 1998). As reported in both articles and summarized in the 1999 book A Dark Place in the Jungle by Canadian novelist Linda Spalding, the Indonesian Ministry of Forestry — with whom Galdikas had clashed over logging policies — claimed that Galdikas held "a very large number of illegal orangutans ... in very poor conditions" at her Indonesian home, prompting the government to consider formal charges. Galdikas denied all such claims in a response to Newsweek in June 1999, remarking that allegations of mistreatment were "simply, wrong" and that the "outlandish" claims formed the basis of "a totally one-sided campaign against me."

See also 

 Jeffrey H. Schwartz
 InfiniteEARTH
 List of animal rights advocates
 List of apes
 Timeline of women in science

References

External links 

 Galdikas's official blog
 Orangutan Foundation Canada
 
 International Birute Galdikas charity fund
 Orangutan.org - Orangutan Foundation International
 "Does an Orangutan find freedom in the gift of words? Do we?"  by Susanne Antonetta (March 2005)
 Profile at science.ca (20 April 2004)
 Tyler Prize for Environmental Achievement, awarded to Galdikas in 1997

1946 births
Living people
20th-century Canadian women scientists
Canadian environmentalists
Canadian anthropologists
Canadian women anthropologists
Canadian people of Lithuanian descent
Lithuanian anthropologists
Lithuanian women anthropologists
Ethologists
Women primatologists
Primatologists
Orangutan conservation
Officers of the Order of Canada
Academic staff of Simon Fraser University
University of California, Los Angeles alumni
Scientists from Toronto
People from Wiesbaden